"Body Language" is Jesse McCartney's fourth and final single from his album Departure and his second and final single from Departure: Recharged.

Release
It has been officially announced by McCartney during his tour that this would be his next single during this summer as a follow up to the successful hit "Leavin'" which was released the previous summer as well as the previous singles, "It's Over" and "How Do You Sleep?". It was released as a remix featuring T-Pain.

Release and composition
The single version featuring T-Pain became available as a digital download on September 8, 2009. It was sent to U.S. radio on the same day.

Versions
 "Body Language (without T-Pain)" – 3:39
 "Body Language (feat. T-Pain)" – 3:42
 Body Language (Element Club - No Rap) 6:35
 Body Language (Element Club) [feat. T-Pain] 6:55 
 Body Language (Bimbo Jones Dub) 6:40
 Body Language (Element Extended Radio Edit - No Rap) 4:53
 Body Language (Element Radio Edit) 4:34
 Body Language (Element Extended Radio Edit) [feat. T-Pain] 5:22 
 Body Language (DJ Mike Cruz Tribal Vox Mix [No Drop]) 8:31
 Body Language (DJ Mike Cruz Tribal Vox (No Drop Mix)) 8:16
 Body Language (DJ Mike Cruz Dubamental) 8:31
 Body Language (DJ Mike Cruz Radio Edit) 4:31
 Body Language (with T-Pain) (Video) - 3:50

Music video
The music video was released on September 8, 2009.
The video shows 4 different shots:
First- McCartney & T-Pain on the studio, recording the song.
Second- McCartney performing the song on his show.
Third- Shots of women walking on a beach.
Fourth- Shots of McCartney on roller coasters and other rides at Six Flags in Maryland.

Chart performance
The song debuted on the Billboard Hot 100 chart of September 19, 2009, at number 84. On October 24, 2009, the song re-entered at number 71, and eventually peaked at number 35 on the chart and becoming 5th top 40 song in the country.

Charts

References

2009 singles
Jesse McCartney songs
T-Pain songs
Hollywood Records singles
Songs written by Jesse McCartney
2008 songs
Song recordings produced by the Movement (production team)